Homrian (also Romanized as Ḩomrīān and Ḩomreyān; also known as Hamziyan) is a village in Pol-e Doab Rural District, Zalian District, Shazand County, Markazi Province, Iran. At the 2006 census, its population was 92, in 26 families.

References 

Populated places in Shazand County